Balboa station is a station on the G Line of the Los Angeles Metro Busway system.  It is named after adjacent Balboa Boulevard, which travels north–south and crosses the east–west transitway route. The station is in the Lake Balboa district of Los Angeles, in the central San Fernando Valley.

Service

Station Layout

Hours and frequency

Connections 
, the following connections are available:
 LADOT Commuter Express: , 

Nearby destinations
The station is within walking distance of the following notable places: 
 Birmingham High School
 Daniel Pearl Magnet High School
 Lake Balboa Park
 Sepulveda Basin Recreation Area
 Metro Orange Line, Los Angeles River and Victory Boulevard bicycle paths

References

External links

G Line (Los Angeles Metro)
Los Angeles Metro Busway stations
Lake Balboa, Los Angeles
Van Nuys, Los Angeles
Public transportation in the San Fernando Valley
Public transportation in Los Angeles
Bus stations in Los Angeles
2005 establishments in California